General Paulo Armindo Lukamba "Gato" (born Armindo Lucas Paulo on May 13, 1954) led UNITA, a former anti-colonial movement that fought against the MPLA in the Angolan Civil War, from the death of António Dembo on March 3, 2002 until he lost the 2003 leadership election to Isaías Samakuva.

Lukamba was born in the province of Huambo, in central Angola.

History
Lukamba joined UNITA during the Carnation revolution in Portugal. He eventually served eight years in France as UNITA's representative there.

From 1995 until the death of Jonas Savimbi in February 2002, Lukamba served as UNITA's Secretary-General. Upon Savimbi's death and the subsequent death of Vice President António Dembo just 10 days later from diabetes and battle wounds, Lukamba assumed control of the rebel group. Lukamba led UNITA in negotiations that ended the Angolan Civil War in April 2002.

Lukamba led UNITA's political party until 2003 when Isaías Samakuva won the leadership election. Samakuva is the President of UNITA until November 2019.

Lukamba was the fifth candidate on UNITA's national list in the September 2008 parliamentary election. He was one of 16 UNITA candidates to win seats in the election.

References

External links
Angola: War is Over, But Peace Comes at a Price Says Unita Leader.
Angola in peace.

1954 births
Living people
Angolan rebels
People of the Angolan Civil War
Members of the National Assembly (Angola)
UNITA politicians
20th-century Angolan people
21st-century Angolan people